Sir George Marwood was a Yorkshire landowner who served as the High Sheriff of Yorkshire in 1651 and was later elected as the Member of Parliament for Northallerton in 1660.

Background 

George Marwood was born in 1601 in Stokesley to Henry and Ann (née Constable) Marwood. His family had been seated at Busby Hall in Little Busby since 1587 and held further property at Wilberfoss, Acomb Grange and Sedbergh. The Marwoods were an ancient family who directly descended from Edward III. He was educated at Lincoln College, Oxford. He married Frances Bethell daughter of Sir Walter Bethell of Alne in 1627.

Marwood had three sons and three daughters:

Sir Henry Marwood, 2nd Baronet
 George Marwood
 Barbara Marwood, married Sir Thomas Hebblethwaite M.P.
 Frances Marwood, married Sir Richard Weston
 Anne Marwood, married William Metcalfe

References 

1600s births
Date of death missing
People from North Yorkshire
Baronets in the Baronetage of England
High Sheriffs of Yorkshire